Masafumi Ogawa (小川将史), born January 14, 1983, is a Japanese retired professional ice hockey forward.

He began his professional career in 2005, playing for the Oji Eagles of Asia League Ice Hockey and would spend his entire professional career with the team until his retirement in 2015. He also played for the Japan national team from 2005 to 2011.

References

Oji Eagle's players profile

1983 births
People from Tomakomai, Hokkaido
Japanese ice hockey forwards
Living people
Oji Eagles players
Sportspeople from Hokkaido
Asian Games silver medalists for Japan
Medalists at the 2011 Asian Winter Games
Asian Games medalists in ice hockey
Ice hockey players at the 2011 Asian Winter Games